66 Arietis (abbreviated 66 Ari) is a double star in the northern constellation of Aries. 66 Arietis is the Flamsteed designation. It has an apparent visual magnitude of 6.03, putting it near the limit for naked eye visibility. The magnitude 10.4 companion is located at an angular separation of 0.810 arcseconds from the primary along a position angle of 65°.

The spectrum of the primary component matches a stellar classification of K0 IV, with the luminosity class of IV indicating this is a subgiant star. It has 6 times the radius of the Sun and shines with 18 times the Sun's energy. This energy is radiated from the outer atmosphere at an effective temperature of 4,864 K, giving it the cool orange-hued glow of a K-type star.

References

External links
 HR 1048
 CCDM J03284 +2248
 Image 66 Arietis

Arietis, 66
021467
Double stars
016181
Aries (constellation)
K-type subgiants
1048
Durchmusterung objects